Living Together is the debut studio album by Vermont. It was released on September 28, 1999 on Kindercore Records.

Track listing
"Indiana Jones"
"Lightning Tattoos"
"Broadway Joe"
"Where Planes Go Down"
"Living Together"
"Bee, Leave Me Be"
"Tiny White Crosses"
"Downtown Heart"
"Old Blue"
"My Favorite Legend"
"These Dudes, They Got a Band"

References

1999 debut albums
Vermont (band) albums
Kindercore Records albums